Ghost Nation is the sixth studio album by Australian rock band, Hunters & Collectors. It was co-produced by the band with Clive Martin and issued on White/Mushroom Records on 27 November 1989. It reached No. 10 on the ARIA Albums Chart, No. 29 in  New Zealand and No. 31 in Sweden.

The album helped Hunters & Collectors win the award of Australian Band of the Year (1990) by Rolling Stone Australia. The band were nominated for six awards at the Fourth Annual ARIA Music Awards in 1990, but they won just one category – Best Cover Art for Ghost Nation by Robert Miles.

Background 

Hunters & Collectors line up in 1987 was John Archer on bass guitar, Doug Falconer on drums, Jack Howard on trumpet, Robert Miles on live sound, Mark Seymour on lead vocals and guitar, Jeremy Smith on French horn, and Michael Waters on keyboards and trombone. Early in 1988 Barry Palmer (also a member of Harem Scarem, ex-Stephen Cummings Band) joined the group on guitar. Ghost Nation, their sixth studio album, was co-produced by the band with Clive Martin. It was released in November 1989 on White Label/Mushroom in Australia and New Zealand and Atlantic in Europe and North America, and was their second Australian Top Ten appearance on the ARIA Albums Chart, peaking at No 10 in February 1990. In New Zealand it reached the top 30 and also charted in Sweden reaching No. 31 on the Sverigetopplistan. It provided four singles, beginning with "When the River Runs Dry", appearing in September and peaking at No. 23 in Australia in December and No. 5 on Billboard Modern Rock Tracks in 1990. The album also includes a cover version of Eric Gradman: Man and Machine's 1979 single, "Crime of Passion".

The album was remastered and re-issued by Liberation Records on 7 July 2003.

Reception 

Australian musicologist, Ian McFarlane, enthused "[it] was perhaps the band's finest album to date". However Allmusic's Mike DeGagne declared that it was "one of this Australian band's weakest attempts, [it] suffers greatly from bland lyrics and gray instrumental work through the entirety of the album". Ed St John in Rolling Stone Australia states "The first thing that strikes me about Ghost Nation is its sound. The band plays with impressive spirit, the grooves flowing with a spontaneous grace that far surpasses much of their earlier work. Moreover the music is beautifully recorded and intelligently, thoughtfully mixed."

The album helped Hunters & Collectors win the award of Australian Band of the Year (1990) by Rolling Stone Australia. The band were nominated for six awards at the ARIA Music Awards of 1990, but won just one category – Best Cover Art for Ghost Nation by Miles.

Track listing

Charts

Certifications

Personnel

Credited to:

Hunters & Collectors
 John Archer – bass guitar
 Doug Falconer – drums, percussion
 John "Jack" Howard – trumpet, keyboards
 Robert Miles – live sound, art director
 Barry Palmer – lead guitar
 Mark Seymour – lead vocals, guitar
 Jeremy Smith – French horn, keyboards, guitar
 Michael Waters – trombone, keyboards

Additional musicians
 Jenn Anderson – strings
 Linda Bull – backing vocals
 Vika Bull – backing vocals
 Chris Dyer – trumpet
 Neil Finn – backing vocals
 Alex Pertout – percussion
 Jex Saarelaht – keyboards
 Ben Taylor – washboard
 Cindy Watkins – strings
 Paul Williamson – saxophone

Production details
 Producer – Hunters & Collectors, Clive Martin
 Engineer – Clive Martin
 Assistant engineers – Peter Edwards, Tony Salter (Platinum Studios); Joe Pirrera (Hit Factory)
 Mixing – Eric Thorngren
 Studio – Platinum Studios, Melbourne (recording); The Hit Factory, New York (mixing)
 Mastering  - Rick O'Neil Festival Records 
 Cover art – Robert Miles

References

1989 albums
ARIA Award-winning albums
Hunters & Collectors albums
Mushroom Records albums